Ihsim (also spelled Ehsem) is a town in northwestern Syria, administratively part of the Ariha District of the Idlib Governorate. According to the Syria Central Bureau of Statistics, Marayan had a population of 5,870 in the 2004 census. It is the administrative center of the Ihsim Subdistrict, which contained a total of 19 localities with a collective population of 65,409 in 2004. Nearby localities include Iblin to the west, al-Barah to the south, al-Dana, Syria to the east, and Marayan to the north.

References

Populated places in Ariha District